The Spaia is a left tributary of the river Timiș in Romania. It discharges into the Timiș in Gavojdia.

References

Rivers of Romania
Rivers of Timiș County